Ironia is an unincorporated community located within Randolph Township, in Morris County, New Jersey, United States. Ironia has a post office with ZIP code 07845.

Notable people
People who were born in, residents of, or otherwise closely associated with Ironia include:
Sailor Stroud, Major League Baseball pitcher

References

Randolph, New Jersey
Unincorporated communities in Morris County, New Jersey
Unincorporated communities in New Jersey